Rhododendron Lake is a lake located on Vancouver Island, Canada, east of South Englishman River and north west of Nanaimo Lakes.  Adjacent to the lake is a small grove of Pacific Rhododendron which is a rare plant on Vancouver Island.

Fishing

Wild populations of native coastal cutthroat trout are found in Rhododendron Lake.

References

Alberni Valley
Lakes of Vancouver Island
Wellington Land District